Daughters of Pleasure is a 1924 American silent romantic comedy film directed by William Beaudine and starring Marie Prevost and Monte Blue. Based on a story by Caleb Proctor, the film features an early appearance by Clara Bow who plays a supporting role.

An incomplete print of the film is housed at the Library of Congress with two of the six reels missing.

Cast
 Marie Prevost - Marjory Hadley
 Monte Blue - Kent Merrill
 Clara Bow - Lila Millas
 Edythe Chapman - Mrs. Hadley
 Wilfred Lucas - Mark Hadley
 Edwin B. Tilton - Uncredited role

References

External links
 
 

1924 films
1924 romantic comedy films
American romantic comedy films
American silent feature films
American black-and-white films
Films based on short fiction
Films directed by William Beaudine
American independent films
Films produced by B. F. Zeidman
1920s American films
Silent romantic comedy films
Silent American comedy films